Mouseterpiece Theater is an American television show that ran on The Disney Channel that premiered on the channel's launch date on April 18, 1983, and continued with reruns into the 1990s.

The show is a spoof of the PBS show Masterpiece Theatre, presenting Disney animated shorts instead of showing dramatic works. Like Masterpiece Theatre, it used a section of Jean-Joseph Mouret's Suite of Symphonies for brass, strings and timpani No. 1 as its theme music, but the Disney show used the third movement rather than the first. George Plimpton hosted and gave commentary and background information before and after each cartoon. Each show tended to have a theme; Goofy's emergence as the staid everyman character for example. It usually ran later in the evenings.

See also
 Good Morning, Mickey!, another Disney Channel show featuring Disney shorts
 List of programs broadcast by Disney Channel
 "Monsterpiece Theater," a recurring segment on Sesame Street

References

External links 
 

1980s American anthology television series
Disney Channel original programming
Television series by Disney